Charles Stanley Reinhart (May 16, 1844 – August 30, 1896), usually cited as C. S. Reinhart, was an American painter and illustrator. He was a nephew of artist Benjamin Franklin Reinhart.

Biography
C.S. Reinhart was born in Pittsburgh, Pennsylvania. After having been employed in railway work and at a steel factory, he studied art at the Atelier Suisse in Paris and at the Munich Academy under Straehuber and Otto. Afterwards he settled in New York City, but spent the years 1882–86 in Paris where he exhibited regularly in the Salon. As a young artist, he along with Edwin Austin Abbey, Robert Blum, A.B. Frost and Howard Pyle, studied under Charles Parsons, who was head of the art department at Harper Brothers in the 1870s. A collection of 247 letters, eight original drawings, and two sketchbooks can be found at Columbia University's Rare Book & Manuscript Library.

A contemporary reviewer said of Reinhart:

A  principal painting, Washed Ashore, depicts the varied reactions of observers to a drowned sailor on a beach. It earned him an Honorable Mention at the 1887 Paris Salon, and the 1888 Temple Gold Medal from the Pennsylvania Academy of the Fine Arts.

Reinhart was also one of several artists selected and commissioned by the U.S. Bureau of Engraving and Printing to design the artwork for the Educational Series silver certificates produced in the late 19th century. The notes depict various allegorical motifs and are considered by some numismatists to be the most beautiful monetary designs ever produced by the United States.

Works
Among his works are:
 "Reconnoitring"
 "Caught Napping"
 "September Morning"
 "Moonshiners" (Harper's Weekly, November 2, 1878)
 "At the Ferry" (watercolor, 1878)
 "The Old Life Boat" (oil, 1880)
 "Obadiah Holmes" (1881)
 "Spanish Barber" (watercolor, 1884)
 "Mussel Fisherwoman" (oil, 1886)
 "Washed Ashore" (won a gold medal at Philadelphia in 1888; oil, 1887)
 "Rising Tide" (purchased by the government at the Paris Exposition, 1889; oil, 1888)
 "Normandy Coast"
 "Gathering Wood" (watercolor, 1887)
 "Sunday"
 "English Garden"

Black and white series
 Reichstag Sketches
 A Little Swiss Sojourn
 Americans Abroad
 Works online from Library of Congress (43)

Literary significance and criticism
It has been argued that the short story The Sculptor's Funeral by Willa Cather uses Charles Stanley Reinhart as the prototype for its protagonist. Cather wrote a feature story about the first anniversary of the death of Reinhart in 1897 when she attended the erection of his monument Allegheny Cemetery in Pittsburgh.

Notes

References

Attribution:

External links

 Works by Charles S. Reinhart at the Library of Congress
 
 
 
 Finding aid to Charles Stanley Reinhart papers at Columbia University. Rare Book & Manuscript Library.

1844 births
1896 deaths
19th-century American painters
American male painters
American people of German descent
Artists from Pittsburgh
Academy of Fine Arts, Munich alumni
Burials at Allegheny Cemetery
National Academy of Design associates
19th-century American male artists